Maurice George Hollis FitzGerald (born 14 February 1976), known professionally as Maurice Fitzgerald, is an English former rugby union player. 

Fitzgerald, who spent the majority of his club career in France, was part of the championship winning Biarritz side of the 2001/02 season.

Biography

Personal
Born in The Hague, Fitzgerald attended Ampleforth College and graduated from Durham University in 1998 with a degree in Modern Languages.

Career
Fitzgerald joined Richmond F.C. following university. In 1999 the club went into administration; Fitzgerald moved to Biarritz, where he had previously spent a year abroad as a student.

In 2003 Fitzgerald was called up to England A for the first time after strong performances in the Heineken Cup and French Championship. He signed for Harlequins for the 2004/05 season and made his debut as a substitute on 27 September 2004 against Worcester, but featured in only a handful of league and cup matches during his final year as a professional.

References

External links
 ESPN Profile

1976 births
Living people
English rugby union players
Alumni of Durham University
Durham University RFC players
People educated at Ampleforth College